The 2011–12 Gil Vicente F.C. season was the club's 79th competitive season, 15th in the Primeira Liga, and 87th year in existence as a football club.

Having achieved promotion from the Segunda Liga as winners of the 2010–11 Liga de Honra, the club were looking to retain their place in the Primeira Liga after a six-year absence from the top flight. The Gilistas finished 9th in the league table, ten points above the relegation zone. Despite suffering an early exit in the Taça de Portugal to third division Torreense, the Gilistas reached their first final of a major competition by reaching the final of the Taça da Liga where they lost 2–1 to Benfica at the Estádio Cidade de Coimbra.

Key events

July
 16: Gil Vicente finish third in the City of Freamunde pre-season tournament behind Moreirense and Desportivo das Aves.
 20: The Gilistas win their first pre-season game by defeating Segunda Liga side Oliveirense 1–0, at the Estádio Carlos Osório. Rui Faria scored Gil Vicente's goal.
 23: Gil Vicente wins their second consecutive pre-season game after a 1–0 victory over Segunda Liga side Sporting da Covilhã.
 26: In Gil Vicente's official presentation to its members of their 2011–12 squad, the Gilistas lose 3–0 to Braga. Zé Luís, who prior to the start of the pre-season campaign signed for Braga from Gil Vicente, scored two of Braga's three goals.
 30: Gil Vicente wins their third pre-season game, after a 4–0 victory over Tirsense. A brace from Kalidou Yéro, a free kick from winger Laionel and second half strike from Hugo Vieira sealed Gil's victory.

August
 12: Gil Vicente open their 2011–12 league campaign with a 2–2 draw at home to Benfica. Benfica led the game 2–0 with goals from Nolito and Javier Saviola in the first 20 minutes of the game, but the Gilistas  recovered from a two-goal deficit to draw the game with a late first-half goal from Hugo Vieira and 73rd-minute strike from Laionel.
 19: Gil Vicente suffer their first loss of the season, away to Porto. A third minute João Vilela penalty opened the scoring for the visitors. Porto equalized eight minutes later, and would go on to score a further two goals through Cristian Săpunaru and Hulk to claim a 3–1 home win.
 27: Gil Vicente win their first league game of the season after a 2-0 home win over Académica de Coimbra. Captain André Cunha opened the scoring in the 69th minute, and Cláudio converted from the penalty spot on 87 minutes to claim all three points for the home side.
 29: Attacking midfielder João Vilela suffers a serious injury in training which would keep him out of action for six months.
 30: Gil's chairman António Fiúsa announces that the club rejected a €500,000 bid from Greek side Panathinaikos for Hugo Vieira.
 31: Gil Vicente announce the loan signing of Guilherme from Braga.

September
 11: Braga inflict on Gil Vicente their second defeat of the league campaign. A brace from Nuno Gomes and a 72nd-minute strike from Hélder Barbosa saw the Bracarenses defeat Os Galos 3–1 at the Estádio Municipal de Braga.
 20: Gil Vicente draws third division side Torreense in the third round of the Taça de Portugal.

October
 15: Gil Vicente suffer a shock third round exit at the hands of third division side Torreense in the Taça da Portugal.

January
 31: Following his release from Benfica, César Peixoto signs a short term deal with Gil Vicente until the end of the season. Gil also announce the loan signing of Cape Verdean striker Zé Luís from Braga.

April
 14: Benfica defeat Gil Vicente 2–1 in the Taça da Liga final. In a match which took place at the Estádio Cidade de Coimbra, Benfica opened the scoring on 30 minutes through Spanish forward Rodrigo. Gil Vicente equalized on 78 minutes through Zé Luís. Benfica would regain the lead six minutes later through Javier Saviola. The Encardnados would hold on to secure a fourth league cup in five seasons.
 28: The Gilistas 3–1 win over Vitória de Guimarães secures their stay in the Primeira Liga. A brace from João Vilela and a second-half strike from Rodrigo Galo secured the win over the Vimaranenses.

May
 12: In their final league game of the season, Gil Vicente comfortably defeat Feirense 3–1 to finish ninth in the Primeira Liga. A first-half strike from Hugo Vieira and a brace from Zé Luís sealed Gil's victory.

Club
Coaching staff
{|class="wikitable"
|-
!Position
!Staff
|-
|Manager|| Paulo Alves
|-
|Assistant Manager|| Pedro Pinto
|-
|Technical Director|| Lim Costa
|-
|Goalkeeper Coach|| Fernando Baptista
|-
|Fitness Coach|| Ricardo Vaz
|-
|Physio|| Lino Silva
|-
|Scout|| Daniel Pacheco
|-
|Head of Youth Development|| Paulo Oliveira
|-Other information

First team squad
Stats as of the end of the 2011–12 season. Games played and goals scored only refers to appearances and goals in domestic league campaigns.

Transfers

In

Summer

Winter

Out

Summer

Winter

Source:

Pre-season and friendlies

Legend

Matches

Competitions

Legend

Overall

Competition record

Primeira Liga

League table

Matches

Taça de Portugal

Matches

Taça da Liga

Second round

Group stage

Knockout phase

Squad

Appearances

Sources:

Top scorers
The list is sorted by shirt number when total goals are equal.

Clean sheets
The list is sorted by shirt number when total appearances are equal.

Summary

References

Gil Vicente F.C. seasons
Gil Vicente